The 2007 season of Formula RUS motor racing, a Russian formula racing class.

Stage 1

Stage 1 took place at the Autodrom Moscow (ADM), on 25 May.

Qualifying 
 Sergey Mokshantsev No71 ( Formula RUS team ) - 01:43.103

Race 1 
 Maksim Travin No46 ( @MAIL.RU team ) - Time-17:34.857 Best lap-01:44.281

 Best lap in race - Sergey Mokshantsev No71 ( Formula RUS team ) - Best lap-01:44.079

Race 2 
 Sergey Mokshantsev No71 ( Formula RUS team ) - Time-17:29.358 Best lap-01:43.603

 Best lap in race - Maksim Travin No46 ( @MAIL.RU team ) - Best lap-01:43.596

Stage 2

Stage 2 took place at the Autodrom Moscow (ADM), on 16–17 June.

Qualifying 
 Qualifying 1 top 5 results

Race 1 

Sergey Mokshantsev has won both heats of season opening racing held at ADM racetrack. Experienced driver from whom 2007 will be second consecutive season in Formula RUS managed to resist hard charge for the lead from talented youngster Maksim Chernev.

First race of the weekend started with a small pile-up in the first turn with Yuri Kim retiring from the race with bent suspension. Action from the drivers camp continued on the second lap as Maksim Travin nearly came on top of his fellow rival David Ramishvili. Trying to squeeze part in the first turn Travin could not avoid direct contact and was somersaulted in the air. Thanks to car structures absorbing forces of impact driver managed to escape unscathed with Ramishvilli rejoined race with much battered car.

In fight for the lead Maksim Chernev was mounting pressure on race leader but despite setting faster lap times could not find his way past Sergey Mokshantsev and finished runner-up with Denis Komarov taking final step on the rostrum.

 Race 1 top 5 results

Race 2 

Second race happened much to the same scenario as the first race but with less damage done.
Sixteen years old driver from Ekaterinburg city was setting fast lap time right on but his relative inexperience paid its dues. Having taken the lead in the second heat race Chernev missed braking and lost his short-lived lead to Mokshantsev. Final podium place was taken by David Ramishvili

 Race 2 Top 5 results

Stage 3
Stage 3 took place at the Autodrom Moscow (ADM), on 30 June - 1 July.

References

External links
Formula RUS official website
Formula RUS PHOTO

Motorsport competitions in Russia
2007 in motorsport
2007 in Russian motorsport